Sydney George Fisher (September 11, 1856 Philadelphia - February 22, 1927 Essington, Pennsylvania) was a United States lawyer and historian, and is best known for his work "The True History of the American Revolution."

Biography
He was the only son of Elizabeth (Ingersoll) and Sidney George Fisher.  His father was also a lawyer and historian. Sydney studied at St. Paul's School in Concord, New Hampshire, graduated from Trinity College in Hartford, Connecticut (1879) with a B.A., studied law at the Harvard Law School for two years, and in 1883 was admitted to the bar at Philadelphia and began a law practice.

Works
He was noted for his studies of United States history. His works attained considerable popularity. They include, in addition to numerous magazine articles:
 The Making of Pennsylvania (1896); 2nd edition (1908)
 Pennsylvania, Colony and Commonwealth (1897)
 The Evolution of the Constitution of the United States (1897, and two later editions)
 Men, Women, and Manners in Colonial Times (2 vols., vol. I vol. II, 1898, and two later editions)
 The True Benjamin Franklin (1899, and six later editions)
 The True William Penn (1900, and three later editions)
 The True History of the American Revolution (1902, and four later editions, then greatly revised and issued in 1908 in 2 vols. as The Struggle for American Independence)
 American Education (1917)
 The Quaker Colonies (1919)

References

External links
 
 

1856 births
1927 deaths
American historians
St. Paul's School (New Hampshire) alumni
Trinity College (Connecticut) alumni
Harvard Law School alumni
19th-century American lawyers